The 2014 Four Nations Tournament was the thirteen edition of the Four Nations Tournament, an invitational women's football tournament held in China.
The tournament was won by China.

Participants

Venues

Final standings

Match results

References 

2014 in women's association football
2014
2014 in Chinese football
2014 in North Korean football
2013–14 in Mexican football
2013–14 in New Zealand association football
February 2014 sports events in China
2014 in Chinese women's sport